Maurice Smith (born 28 September 1980 in St. Catherine, Jamaica) is a decathlete from Jamaica. He competed for Auburn University. He represented his native country at the 2004 Summer Olympics in Athens, Greece, finishing in 14th place. He broke the Pan American Games decathlon record in 2007, winning his first international gold medal. He won the silver medal in the decathlon at the 2007 World Championships. Smith is the current national record holder in the men's decathlon, with 8644 points.

Smith beat World Champion Roman Šebrle and Dmitriy Karpov at the TNT-Fortuna Combined Events meeting in Kladno, Czech Republic with 8157 points, setting him up well for the 2009 World Championships in Athletics.

Personal bests
Decathlon: 8644 pts –  Osaka, 1 September 2007

Achievements

References

External links

 
 
 Tilastopaja biography

1980 births
Jamaican decathletes
Living people
People from Saint Catherine Parish
Auburn Tigers men's track and field athletes
Olympic athletes of Jamaica
Athletes (track and field) at the 2008 Summer Olympics
Athletes (track and field) at the 2011 Pan American Games
World Athletics Championships medalists
Commonwealth Games medallists in athletics
Commonwealth Games silver medallists for Jamaica
Pan American Games gold medalists for Jamaica
Pan American Games silver medalists for Jamaica
Jamaican sportsmen
Athletes (track and field) at the 2006 Commonwealth Games
Pan American Games medalists in athletics (track and field)
Central American and Caribbean Games gold medalists for Jamaica
Competitors at the 2010 Central American and Caribbean Games
Central American and Caribbean Games medalists in athletics
Medalists at the 2011 Pan American Games
Auburn University alumni
Medallists at the 2006 Commonwealth Games